This is the discography of Japanese pop singer melody.

Albums

Studio albums

Compilation albums

Featured albums

Singles

Featured singles

DVDs

Featured DVDs

Music videos

 Dreamin' Away
Studio Album: Sincerely
Length: 3:14
Director: David Brooks
Released: February 19, 2003
 Simple As That
Studio Album: Sincerely
Length: 4:52
Released: June 18, 2003
 Crystal Love
Studio Album: Sincerely
Length: 5:07
Released: November 27, 2003
 Believe Me
Length: 4:44
Released: June 9, 2004

 Next to You
Studio Album: Be as One
Length: 4:34
Released: January 12, 2005
 Realize
Studio Album: Be as One
Length: 3:46
Released: August 17, 2005
 See You...
Studio Album: Be as One
Length: 4:34
Released: February 15, 2006
 Lovin' U
Studio Album: Ready to Go!
Length: 4:32
Released: November 8, 2006
 Finding My Road
Studio Album: Ready to Go!
Length: 4:28
Released: February 14, 2007

 Love Story
Studio Album: Ready to Go!
Length: 4:47
Released: May 30, 2007
 BoRn 2 luv U (Melody Loves M-Flo)
Length: 3:26
Released: May 30, 2007
 Haruka: Haruka
Studio Album: Lei Aloha
Length: 6:31
Released: February 13, 2008
 Boyfriend/Girlfriend (Tanaka Roma featuring Melody)
Studio Album: Daybreak
Length: 5:09
Released: April 30, 2008

Discographies of Japanese artists
Pop music discographies